Donald William Curtin (November 3, 1901 – March 17, 1963) was a player in the National Football League and a physician in Kimberly, Wisconsin.

Life
Curtin was born on November 3, 1901, in Hollandtown, Wisconsin. He practiced medicine in Kimberly from 1933 until the time of his death. He died from a heart ailment on March 17, 1963, while vacationing in West Palm Beach, Florida.

Football career
Curtin was a star football player for Marquette University in 1923 and 1924. He split the 1926 NFL season between the Milwaukee Badgers and the Racine Tornadoes.

References

External links

People from Holland, Brown County, Wisconsin
People from Kimberly, Wisconsin
Players of American football from Milwaukee
Milwaukee Badgers players
Racine Tornadoes players
American football quarterbacks
Marquette Golden Avalanche football players
Physicians from Wisconsin
1901 births
1963 deaths
Burials in Wisconsin